John Andrew Rabb (born June 23, 1960) is an American former professional baseball player. A catcher, his career extended for 14 seasons (1978–1991), and he spent 108 games in one full season (} and parts of four others (–;) in Major League Baseball, mostly for the San Francisco Giants.

Career
He had a brief trial with the Giants in 1982 after hitting 22 home runs for Triple-A Phoenix, then was returned to the minor leagues to begin 1983. A hot start in the Pacific Coast League — 51 runs batted in, ten homers, and a .343 batting average in 62 games — earned him a June call-up to San Francisco. He backed up regular catcher Bob Brenly for the remainder of 1983 and all of 1984, but hit poorly (.215 in 186 at bats). The Giants traded Rabb to the Atlanta Braves for another catcher, Alex Treviño, prior to the 1985 season. But Rabb spent much of the campaign with the Richmond Braves and got into only three games for Atlanta at the end of the season, plus nine more for 1988 Seattle Mariners, to culminate his MLB career.

In the Majors, Rabb's 46 hits included 12 doubles, one triple and four home runs.  But in the minor leagues, he belted 173 home runs (not counting his service in the Triple-A Mexican League), and exceeded the 19-homer mark seven times in a dozen seasons.

References

External links
, or Retrosheet
Pura Pelota (Venezuelan Winter League)

1960 births
Living people
African-American baseball players
Algodoneros de Unión Laguna players
American expatriate baseball players in Canada
American expatriate baseball players in Mexico
Atlanta Braves players
Baseball players from Los Angeles
Calgary Cannons players
Cedar Rapids Giants players
Fresno Giants players
Great Falls Giants players
Major League Baseball catchers
Navegantes del Magallanes players
American expatriate baseball players in Venezuela
Phoenix Giants players
Reno Silver Sox players
Richmond Braves players
Salinas Spurs players
San Bernardino Spirit players
San Francisco Giants players
Seattle Mariners players
Shreveport Captains players
Sultanes de Monterrey players
21st-century African-American people
20th-century African-American sportspeople